Blairquhan is a Regency era castle near Maybole in South Ayrshire, Scotland. It was the historic home of the Hunter-Blair Baronets and remained in the family's possession until 2012, when it was sold to a Chinese company.

Blairquhan is protected as a Category A listed building, and the grounds are included in the Inventory of Gardens and Designed Landscapes in Scotland, the national listing of significant gardens.

History
Four different families have lived at Blairquhan or on its lands. The McWhirters built the first tower house about 1346. The Kennedys then inherited the estate through marriage and built the remainder of the old castle about 1573. In the early 17th century the Whitefords took over, but in 1798, suffering the effects of a bank crash, they sold Blairquhan to Sir David Hunter Blair, 3rd Baronet, the second son of Sir James Hunter Blair, 1st Baronet who had married Jean Blair, the daughter and heiress of John Blair of Dunskey in Wigtownshire in 1770. When Jean Blair inherited her father's estate in 1777, the family took the additional surname of Blair.  Sir David Hunter Blair made some of his money in Jamaica and was joint-owner of Roselle Estate, St Thomas-in-the-East.

In 1820, Sir David commissioned Scottish architect William Burn to design a new house on Blairquhan. The old castle, which had become ruinous due to previous fires and neglect, was torn down for a new the Tudor-style castle, which nevertheless incorporated some of the decorative mouldings and sculpted stones from the old castle into the kitchen courtyard of the new house. The new mansion was completed in 1824, and contains many antiques and an important collection of paintings by Scottish artists. In late 2012, Sir Patrick David Hunter-Blair, 9th Baronet, sold Blairquhan to Ganten Scotland, a subsidiary of a Chinese company which bottles mineral water for distribution around the world.

The estate and grounds
Blairquhan is approached from the north via a  drive along the River Girvan. The late James Hunter Blair (1926–2004), younger brother and heir presumptive of Sir Edward Hunter-Blair, 8th Baronet (1920–2006), was a noted horticulturalist and forester who spent most of his life restoring the castle and preserving the estate grounds, which includes veteran trees and a walled garden. An ancient sycamore which stands in the shadow of the castle is thought to be a Dule Tree or gallows tree, planted early in the 16th century during the reign of King James V of Scotland.  The once-spreading crown was heavily pruned in 1997, saving the much-weakened trunk from total collapse.

As a tourist attraction
To help offset operating costs, James Hunter Blair opened the  estate as a venue for private functions such as weddings, corporate outings and filming. The current owners continue this operation, offering the castle as an exclusive use venue. Blairquhan was seen in the UK television programme Beauty and the Geek. Its interiors and grounds were also used as a substitute location for Balmoral Castle in the Oscar-winning 2006 film The Queen, starring Helen Mirren.

References 
Notes

Bigliography
Blairquhan Castle, Gazetteer for Scotland
Blairquhan House, Royal Commission on the Ancient and Historical Monuments of Scotland

External links

Blairquhan home page
Blair Society for Genealogical Research

Castles in South Ayrshire
Category A listed buildings in South Ayrshire
Listed houses in Scotland
Inventory of Gardens and Designed Landscapes
Gardens in South Ayrshire
Historic house museums in South Ayrshire
Houses completed in 1824
Country houses in South Ayrshire